The Pierce County Jail (also known as the Blackshear Jail) is a historic building built in 1894 in Blackshear, Georgia.  It was added to the National Register of Historic Places on May 28, 1980.

History
An old wooden jail burned in 1880 and a jail made of wood and metal was built in 1882.  In 1894 a new two-story brick jail was built, with room for the jail keeper to live on the first floor.  It was used as a jail from then until 1926.  The building was then used as a city hall and police headquarters until 1976.

Photos

See also
 Blackshear Prison

References

External links
 

Defunct prisons in Georgia (U.S. state)
Jails on the National Register of Historic Places in Georgia (U.S. state)
Buildings and structures in Pierce County, Georgia
Jails in Georgia (U.S. state)
National Register of Historic Places in Pierce County, Georgia
1894 establishments in Georgia (U.S. state)